The 2005 IIHF World Championship Division III was an international ice hockey tournament run by the International Ice Hockey Federation.  The tournament was contested on 7–13 March 2005 in Mexico City, Mexico. Mexico won the championship and gained promotion, along with South Africa, into the 2006 Division II tournament.

Participants

Standings

Fixtures
All times local.

Scoring leaders
List shows the top ten players sorted by points, then goals.
Source: IIHF.com

Leading goaltenders
Only the top five goaltenders, based on save percentage, who have played 40% of their team's minutes are included in this list.
Source: IIHF.com

References

External links
International Ice Hockey Federation
Report from event at SVT's open archive 

IIHF World Championship Division III
4III
ice
ice
ice
2005